Prong Number One is a  long 3rd order tributary to Gravelly Branch in Sussex County, Delaware.

Course
Prong Number One rises about 1.5 miles south-southeast of Oakley, Delaware, and then flows south to join Gravelly Branch about 0.25 miles northwest of Kings Crossroads.

Watershed
Prong Number One drains  of area, receives about 45.4 in/year of precipitation, has a wetness index of 781.58, and is about 11% forested.

See also
List of rivers of Delaware

References

Rivers of Delaware
Rivers of Sussex County, Delaware